The PGA Seniors Championship is a European Senior Tour golf tournament for men aged fifty and above. It was founded in 1957 and became part of the European Senior Tour on its founding in 1992. It was not held in 2016 or 2017 but returned in 2018 as the Staysure PGA Seniors Championship.

It is the oldest important seniors tournament in Europe and, together with the Senior Open Championship, one of only two current events that predate the founding of the European Senior Tour in 1992. The PGA Seniors Championship and the Senior Open Championship are also the only two Europe-based events on the European Senior Tour that are played over 72 holes.

History
From 1957 to 1966 the event was played over 54 holes. Since then it has been a 72-hole event with the exception of 1993 to 1995 when it was again played over 54 holes. In 1987 and 2012 it was reduced to 54 holes by bad weather.

From its foundation in 1957 until 1978 the winner played the winner of the American Senior PGA Championship for the World Senior Championship, a one-day 36-hole match-play event. The winner won the Teacher International Trophy.

Venues
From 1957 to 1968 the event was held in England, except in 1967 when it was held at Ayr Belleisle in Scotland. From 1969 to 1974 the event was sponsored by Pringle of Scotland and played in Scotland. It was also played in Scotland in 1975 and 1976, from 1980 to 1982 and in 1988 but otherwise was held in England. It was played at the Royal Dublin Golf Club in the Republic of Ireland in 1992 but since 1993 it has been played in England.

Trivia
In 2008, Gordon J. Brand beat Gordon Brand Jnr after a six-hole playoff.

Winners

References

External links

Coverage on the European Senior Tour's official site

European Senior Tour events
Golf tournaments in the United Kingdom
Golf tournaments in the Republic of Ireland
Recurring sporting events established in 1957
International Sports Promotion Society
1957 establishments in England